Terrorizer LA is an American grindcore and death metal band formed in 2014. Oscar Garcia was invited by Jesse Pintado’s sister to put together a new lineup of Terrorizer (his version known as Terrorizer LA or TLA) for a festival celebrating what would have been Jesse Pintado’s 45th birthday. He asked fellow Nausea member Leon del Muerte (Murder Construct) to play guitar, and shortly afterward Cosmo Reveles, Rick Cortez (Sadistic Intent) and Mike Caffell (Dreaming Dead, Exhausted Prayer) were recruited to fill out the band. The band continues to play under the Terrorizer LA name.

Band members

Current
 Oscar Garcia – vocals (2014–present)
 Leon del Muerte – guitar (2014–present)
 Carlos "Cosmo" Reveles – bass (2014–present)
 Adam Houmam – drums (2017–present)

Former
 Matt Olivo – guitar (2014)
 Nelson Lopez – drums (2014)
 Rick Cortez – guitar (2014–2015)
 Mike Caffell – drums (2014-2016)

Discography

Compilations
Before the Downfall (FOAD Records, 2015) – a collection of Terrorizer demos and unreleased material.

References

Death metal musical groups from California
American grindcore musical groups
Deathgrind musical groups